The 2019 Varsity Sport, the 10 season of a South African university.

Athletics

Basketball
4-6 and 10–12 October, Wits Multi-purpose Sports Hall, University of the Witwatersrand. Significantly, Varsity Women's Basketball will make its debut this time around.

Women
VUT 58(1) - 58(0) NWU, first six shootout efforts, VUT is win

Men
UJ 64 -  Tuks 57

Cricket
Tuks final against UJ at Senwes Park, Potchefstroom

Knockout stage

Awards
MTN Pulse Best Bowler of the Tournament: Sean Gilson (UP-Tuks)
Best batsman of the tournament: Lourén Steenkamp (NWU)
FNB Player of the tournament: Neil Brand (UP-Tuks)

Football

Men
NWU (beat TUT 1–0)

Women
TUT (beat UWC 4–1 in shootout after 1-1 full-time)

Hockey

First legs: UCT Hockey, University of Cape Town, Rondebosch
Two legs: NWU Astro, North-West University, Potchefstroom

Knockout stage

Final standings

Awards
The following awards were given at the conclusion of the tournament.

Mountain bike
FNB Wines2Whales Pinotage, Oak Valley Estate in Elgin, 28–30 October 2019, the three-day stage race. Teams from Stellenbosch University (Maties), the University of Cape Town (UCT), North-West University (NWU), University of Pretoria (Tuks), Nelson Mandela University (Madibaz) and the Tshwane University of Technology (TUT), will be invited to compete. Each of the six universities will be invited to send two teams; either men's, women's or one of each.

Men

Women

Netball

Tuks are the champions, and became the first team to do so unbeaten throughout, after beating Maties 48–43 on 7 October 2019, Rembrandt Hall, University of Pretoria.

7s Rugby
4-5 October 2019, Pirates Rugby Club, Greenside, Johannesburg

Women
The inaugural Varsity Women's 7s 
The teams competing are; UP-Tuks (University of Pretoria), UJ (University of Johannesburg), UKZN (University of KwaZulu-Natal) and UFH (University of Fort Hare). Tuks possibly played one of their best games of the season when they beat UFH in the final 46-0

Men

Quarter-finals

Bowl Semi-Finals Fixtures

See also 
Varsity Sports (South Africa)
2019 Varsity Cup

References

Varsity Sports (South Africa)